"Heresy" is a song written by and performed by Rush and appears on their 1991 album Roll the Bones. The song is about the fall of communism in Eastern Europe and Russia, resultant about-face consumerism and the passing of the Cold War nuclear threat.

Song
Like the rest of the album Roll the Bones, "Heresy" also marks the transition from the band's 1980s style to their sound of the 1990s where guitars are a prominent part of this song and keyboard and organ are played in the background. As with the vast majority of Rush songs since the album Fly by Night, Geddy Lee and Alex Lifeson composed the song's music while Neil Peart wrote the lyrics.

The percussion aspect of this song was noted in the Roll the Bones Tour program. Neil Peart explains,

Lyrics
The song speaks of the wall coming down, and the liberation of Eastern European from Communism which started in 1989 and continued through the early 1990s. While historians and journalists alike celebrated these events, Neil Peart took a different view of these monumental changes in Europe. In the Roll the Bones tour program, he asserted,

The song speaks of capitalism with people who were now suddenly free buying up everything they've ever wanted to. The song concludes with the fact that all other countries that were not under the communist yoke were threatened by the possibility of nuclear war. Referring to the Cold War, the military spending, and building of nuclear bombs for that war, the song's main line was, "All those precious wasted years. Who will pay?"

See also
List of Rush songs

Notes
Rush drummer Neil Peart discussed the topic of the end of the Cold War further in his fourth book, Roadshow: Landscape with Drums.

This is one of only four songs by Rush which contains potentially offensive language: "All the crap we had to take". The other three are "Dog Years" from the album Test for Echo, in which Geddy sings "For every sad son of a bitch"; the third song is The Pass from the album Presto, containing the line "Christ, what have you done?"; and the fourth song is "Neurotica", also from Roll the Bones: "Snap! Hide in your shell, let the world go to hell...".

References

Rush Concert Program:  https://web.archive.org/web/20110714035406/http://www.marketworks.com/storefrontprofiles/DeluxeSFItemDetail.aspx?sid=1&sfid=77432&c=918962&i=15281299

Rush (band) songs
1991 songs
1992 singles
Protest songs
Songs written by Geddy Lee
Songs written by Alex Lifeson
Songs written by Neil Peart
Atlantic Records singles
Song recordings produced by Rupert Hine